The NCAA badminton championship is a demonstration sport that was introduced in its 2009–10 season. No tournament was held in season 87.

Champions

Number of championships by school

See also
 UAAP Badminton Championship

External links
Champions list at the official NCAA Philippines website

Badminton
Badminton tournaments in the Philippines